The 2016 Challenge Trophy is the national championship for men's soccer clubs competing at division 4 and below in the Canadian soccer pyramid.  It will be held in St. John's, Newfoundland from October 5–10, 2016.

Teams 
Twelve teams were granted entry into the competition; one from each Canadian province.  In addition, as the host province, Newfoundland and Labrador was granted a second entry into the competition, while Alberta was also granted a second entry after the withdrawal of the Northwest Territories.

Teams are selected by their provincial soccer associations; most often qualifying by winning provincial leagues or cup championships such as the Ontario Cup.

Venues 
King George V Park in St. John's will serve as the tournament's main venue, with Topsail Field in Conception Bay South and the Mount Pearl Soccer Complex in Mount Pearl serving as secondary venues.  The Feildian Grounds in St. John's and Diane Whelan Soccer Complex in Paradise will host some consolation round games.

Group stage
The twelve teams in the competition are divided into four groups of three teams each, which then play a single-game round-robin format.  The top two teams from each group advance to the knockout round, while the third-placed team enters a relegation tournament.

Group A

Group B

Group C

Group D

Classification tournament 
Third-placed teams from the group stage are entered into the classification tournament to determine overall rankings at the end of the tournament.

Knockout Round 
Teams placed first and second from each group in the group stage advance to the knockout round.  All teams play three matches, as teams that lose in the knockout round still advance to face other losing teams to determine final classifications for 3rd through 8th place.

Quarterfinals

Semifinals

Final

Tournament ranking

References

External links 
 Canadian Soccer Association National Championships 

Challenge
Canadian National Challenge Cup